The  is the main cultural military tattoo in Tokyo, which features guest bands from the Asia-Pacific regions as well as bands of the Japan Self-Defense Forces. It is regularly held at the Nippon Budokan in Tokyo every November. The festival was established in 1963, and is one of the oldest military tattoos in the Asia-Pacific region.

History
The first event was held at the Tokyo Metropolitan Gymnasium as an independent Self-Defense Force commemorative event on 27 October 1963. It has been held every year since 1964, particularly during the Tokyo Olympics and in 1988, when Emperor Showa's medical condition worsened and celebratory events were therefore requested. From 1973, Nippon Budokan began to be used as a venue, however in 2019 (the first year of the Reiwa era), it was held at the Yoyogi National Gymnasium due to the renovation of the Budokan.

Overview
The content of each performance is a 2-hour presentation, which is composed of various songs such as pops, classical, jazz, theme music of movie and TV drama, anime songs, game music, and Japanese folk songs.

Every year, the last performance on the last day is broadcast simultaneously on the Internet, and edited DVDs are also marketed at a later date.

The organizer is Minister of Defense, with JGSDF Chief of Staff being in charge of implementation.

Notable participants
The following multinational units have participated in the three day festival over the years:

Regular and semi-regular participants 
 Japan Ground Self-Defense Force Central Band
 Japan Maritime Self-Defense Force Band, Tokyo (JMSDF's central band)
 Japan Air Self-Defense Force Central Band
 JGSDF Northern Army Band
 JGSDF North Eastern Army Band
 JGSDF Eastern Army Band
 JGSDF Central Army Band
 JGSDF Western Army Band
 JGSDF 302nd Military Police Company (National honor guard)
 National Defense Academy Honor Guard
 United States Marine Corps III Marine Expeditionary Force Band
 United States Army Japan Band (which has participated in the festival consecutively since 1980)
 United States Seventh Fleet Band
 United States Air Force Band of the Pacific-Asia

Guest participants in past 
 Korean Navy Band
 Bagad Lann Bihoue of the French Navy
 Singapore Armed Forces Band
 Philippine Marine Corps Drum and Bugle Team
 Australian Army Band
 Indian Army Chief's Band
 Royal Thai Army Band
 Royal Thai Air Force Band
 Military Ceremonial Troupe of the Vietnam People’s Army
 Staff Band of the Bundeswehr

Photos

References

External links
 (Japanese)

Festivals established in 1963
Military tattoos
Tourist attractions in Tokyo